The Blackfoot diatreme is a diatreme in southeastern British Columbia, Canada, located  northeast of Cranbrook. The diatreme is elongate in shape, and outcrops east of Blackfoot Creek.

See also
Volcanism in Canada
List of volcanoes in Canada

References

Diatremes of British Columbia
East Kootenay